Gloria Marie Steinem (born March 25, 1934) is an American journalist and social-political activist who emerged as a nationally recognized leader of second-wave feminism in the United States in the late 1960s and early 1970s. 

Steinem was a columnist for New York magazine and a co-founder of Ms. magazine. In 1969, Steinem published an article, "After Black Power, Women's Liberation," which brought her national attention and positioned her as a feminist leader. In 1971, she co-founded the National Women's Political Caucus which provides training and support for women who seek elected and appointed offices in government. Also in 1971, she co-founded the Women's Action Alliance which, until 1997, provided support to a network of feminist activists and worked to advance feminist causes and legislation. In the 1990s, Steinem helped establish Take Our Daughters to Work Day, an occasion for young girls to learn about future career opportunities. In 2005, Steinem, Jane Fonda, and Robin Morgan co-founded the Women's Media Center, an organization that "works to make women visible and powerful in the media."

, Steinem was traveling internationally as an organizer and lecturer, and was a media spokeswoman on issues of equality.
In 2015, Steinem, alongside two Nobel Peace Laureates (Mairead Maguire of Northern Ireland and Leymah Gbowee of Liberia), Abigail Disney, and other prominent women peace activists, undertook a journey from the capital of North Korea, Pyongyang to South Korea, crossing the most heavily militarized zone in the world between the two Koreas.

Early life 
Steinem was born on March 25, 1934, in Toledo, Ohio, the daughter of Ruth (née Nuneviller) and Leo Steinem. Her mother was Presbyterian, mostly of German (including Prussian) and some Scottish descent. Her father was Jewish, the son of immigrants from Württemberg, Germany, and Radziejów, Poland. Her paternal grandmother, Pauline Perlmutter Steinem, was chairwoman of the educational committee of the National Woman Suffrage Association, a delegate to the 1908 International Council of Women, and the first woman to be elected to the Toledo Board of Education, as well as a leader in the movement for vocational education. Pauline also rescued many members of her family from the Holocaust.

The Steinems lived and traveled about in a trailer, from which Leo carried out his trade as a roaming antiques dealer. Before Gloria was born, her mother, Ruth, then age 34, had a "nervous breakdown" which left her an invalid, trapped in delusional fantasies that occasionally turned violent. She changed "from an energetic, fun-loving, book-loving" woman into "someone who was afraid to be alone, who could not hang on to reality long enough to hold a job, and who could rarely concentrate enough to read a book." Ruth spent long periods in and out of sanatoriums for the mentally ill. Steinem was ten years old when her parents separated in 1944. Her father went to California to find work, while she and her mother continued to live together in Toledo.

While her parents divorced under the stress of her mother's illness, Steinem did not attribute it at all to male chauvinism on the father's part—she claims to have "understood and never blamed him for the breakup." Nevertheless, the impact of these events had a formative effect on her personality: while her father, a traveling salesman, had never provided much financial stability to the family, his exit aggravated their situation. Steinem concluded that her mother's inability to hold on to a job was evidence of general hostility towards working women. She also concluded that the general apathy of doctors towards her mother emerged from a similar anti-woman animus. Years later, Steinem described her mother's experience as pivotal to her understanding of social injustices. These perspectives convinced Steinem that women lacked social and political equality.

Steinem attended Waite High School in Toledo and Western High School in Washington, D.C., graduating from the latter while living with her older sister Susanne Steinem Patch. She then attended Smith College, an institution with which she continues to remain engaged, from which she received her A.B. magna cum laude and graduated as a member of Phi Beta Kappa.

In 1957, Steinem had an abortion. The procedure was performed by Dr. John Sharpe, a British physician, when abortion was still illegal. Years later, Steinem dedicated her memoir My Life on the Road (2015) to him. She wrote, 

"Dr. John Sharpe of London, who in 1957, a decade before physicians in England could legally perform an abortion for any             reason other than the health of the woman, took the considerable risk of referring for an abortion a twenty-two-year-old American on her way to India. Knowing only that she had broken an engagement at home to seek an unknown fate, he said, 'You must promise me two things. First, you will not tell anyone my name. Second, you will do what you want to do with your life.'"

In the late 1950s, Steinem spent two years in India as a Chester Bowles Asian Fellow. After returning to the United States, she served as director of the Independent Research Service, an organization funded in secret by a donor that turned out to be the CIA. She worked to send non-Communist American students to the 1959 World Youth Festival. In 1960, she was hired by Warren Publishing as the first employee of Help! magazine.

In 1950s, she was influenced by Mahatma Gandhi, and later she went ahead to model her campaign after Gandhi's independence movement.

Journalism 

Esquire magazine features editor Clay Felker gave freelance writer Steinem what she later called her first "serious assignment", regarding contraception; he didn't like her first draft and had her re-write the article. Her resulting 1962 article about the way in which women are forced to choose between a career and marriage preceded Betty Friedan's book The Feminine Mystique by one year.

In 1963, while working on an article for Huntington Hartford's Show magazine, Steinem was employed as a Playboy Bunny at the New York Playboy Club. The article, published in 1963 as "A Bunny's Tale", featured a photo of Steinem in Bunny uniform and detailed how women were treated at those clubs. Steinem has maintained that she is proud of the work she did publicizing the exploitative working conditions of the bunnies and especially the sexual demands made of them, which skirted the edge of the law. However, for a brief period after the article was published, Steinem was unable to land other assignments; in her words, this was "because I had now become a Bunny—and it didn't matter why."  However, on the upside, the article compelled the owner of Playboy, Hugh Hefner, to review and improve the working conditions of the Bunnies.

In the interim, she conducted an interview with John Lennon for Cosmopolitan magazine in 1964. In 1965, she wrote for NBC-TV's weekly satirical revue, That Was The Week That Was (TW3), contributing a regular segment entitled "Surrealism in Everyday Life". Steinem eventually landed a job at Felker's newly founded New York magazine in 1968.

In 1969, she covered an abortion speak-out for New York Magazine, which was held in a church basement in Greenwich Village, New York. Steinem had had an abortion herself in London at the age of 22. She felt what she called a "big click" at the speak-out, and later said she didn't "begin my life as an active feminist" until that day. As she recalled, "It [abortion] is supposed to make us a bad person. But I must say, I never felt that. I used to sit and try and figure out how old the child would be, trying to make myself feel guilty. But I never could! I think the person who said: 'Honey, if men could get pregnant, abortion would be a sacrament' was right. Speaking for myself, I knew it was the first time I had taken responsibility for my own life. I wasn't going to let things happen to me. I was going to direct my life, and therefore it felt positive. But still, I didn't tell anyone. Because I knew that out there it wasn't [positive]." She also said, "In later years, if I'm remembered at all it will be for inventing a phrase like 'reproductive freedom'  ... as a phrase it includes the freedom to have children or not to. So it makes it possible for us to make a coalition."

In 1972, she co-founded the feminist-themed magazine Ms. alongside founding editors Letty Cottin Pogrebin, Mary Thom, Patricia Carbine, Joanne Edgar, Nina Finkelstein, Dorothy Pitman Hughes, and Mary Peacock; it began as a special edition of New York, and Clay Felker funded the first issue. Its 300,000 test copies sold out nationwide in eight days. Within weeks, Ms. had received 26,000 subscription orders and more than 20,000 reader letters. In 1974, Ms. collaborated with public television to produce the television program Woman Alive!, and Steinem was featured in the first episode in her role as co-founder of Ms. magazine. The magazine was sold to the Feminist Majority Foundation in 2001; Steinem remains on the masthead as one of six founding editors and serves on the advisory board.

Also in 1972, Steinem became the first woman to speak at the National Press Club.

In November 1977, Steinem spoke at the 1977 National Women's Conference among other speakers including Rosalynn Carter, Betty Ford, Lady Bird Johnson, Bella Abzug, Barbara Jordan, Cecilia Burciaga, Lenore Hershey, and Jean O'Leary.

In 1978, Steinem wrote a semi-satirical essay for Cosmopolitan titled "If Men Could Menstruate" in which she imagined a world where men menstruate instead of women. She concludes in the essay that in such a world, menstruation would become a badge of honor with men comparing their relative sufferings,  rather than the source of shame that it had been for women.

On March 22, 1998, Steinem published an op-ed in The New York Times ("Feminists and the Clinton Question") in which she claimed that Bill Clinton's alleged behavior did not constitute sexual harassment, although she did not actually challenge the accounts by his accusers. The op-ed was criticized by various writers, as in the Harvard Crimson and in the Times itself. In 2017, Steinem, in an interview with the British newspaper The Guardian, stood by her 1998 New York Times op-ed, but also said: "I wouldn't write the same thing now."

Activism 
In 1959, Steinem led a group of activists in Cambridge, Massachusetts, to organize the Independent Service for Information on the Vienna festival, to advocate for American participation in the World Youth Festival, a Soviet-sponsored youth event.

In 1968, Steinem signed the "Writers and Editors War Tax Protest" pledge, vowing to refuse tax payments in protest against the Vietnam War.

In 1969, she published an article, "After Black Power, Women's Liberation" which brought her to national fame as a feminist leader. As such she campaigned for the Equal Rights Amendment, testifying before the Senate Judiciary Committee in its favor in 1970. That same year she published her essay on a utopia of gender equality, "What It Would Be Like If Women Win", in Time magazine.

On July 10, 1971, Steinem was one of more than three hundred women who founded the National Women's Political Caucus (NWPC), including such notables as Bella Abzug, Betty Friedan, Shirley Chisholm, and Myrlie Evers-Williams. As a co-convener of the Caucus, she delivered the speech "Address to the Women of America", stating in part:

In 1972, she ran as a delegate for Shirley Chisholm in New York, but lost.

In March 1973, she addressed the first national conference of Stewardesses for Women's Rights, which she continued to support throughout its existence. Stewardesses for Women's Rights folded in the spring of 1976.

Despite her influence in the feminist movement, Steinem also earned criticism from some feminists as well, who questioned whether she was committed to the movement or using it to promote her glamorous image. The Redstockings also singled her out for agreeing to cooperate with the CIA-backed Independent Research Service. It was also acknowledged that Steinem worked as a CIA agent when this operation was taking place.

Steinem, who grew up reading Wonder Woman comics, was also a key player in the restoration of Wonder Woman's powers and traditional costume, which were restored in issue #204 (January–February 1973).  Steinem, offended that the most famous female superhero had been depowered, had placed Wonder Woman (in costume) on the cover of the first issue of Ms. (1972)—Warner Communications, DC Comics' owner, was an investor—which also contained an appreciative essay about the character. In doing so, however, Steinem forced the firing of Samuel R. Delany who had taken over scripting duties with issue #202. Delany was supposed to write a six-issue story arc, which would culminate in a battle over an abortion clinic where Wonder Woman was to defend women trying to use their services, a critical feminist issue at the time. The story outlines and the work already done on the issues was scrapped, something that Steinem was not aware of and made no attempt to rectify.

In 1976, the first women-only Passover seder was held in Esther M. Broner's New York City apartment and led by Broner, with 13 women attending, including Steinem.

In 1977, Steinem became an associate of the Women's Institute for Freedom of the Press (WIFP). WIFP is an American nonprofit publishing organization. The organization works to increase communication between women and connect the public with forms of women-based media.

In 1984, Steinem was arrested along with a number of members of Congress and civil rights activists for disorderly conduct outside the South African embassy while protesting against the South African apartheid system.

At the outset of the Gulf War in 1991, Steinem, along with prominent feminists Robin Morgan and Kate Millett, publicly opposed an incursion into the Middle East and asserted that ostensible goal of "defending democracy" was a pretense.

During the Clarence Thomas sexual harassment scandal in 1991, Steinem voiced strong support for Anita Hill and suggested that one day Hill herself would sit on the Supreme Court.

In 1992, Steinem co-founded Choice USA, a non-profit organization that mobilizes and provides ongoing support to a younger generation that lobbies for reproductive choice.

In 1993, Steinem co-produced and narrated an Emmy Award-winning TV documentary for HBO about child abuse, called, "Multiple Personalities: The Search for Deadly Memories". Also in 1993, she and Rosilyn Heller co-produced an original TV movie for Lifetime, "Better Off Dead", which examined the parallel forces that both oppose abortion and support the death penalty.

She contributed the piece "The Media and the Movement: A User's Guide" to the 2003 anthology Sisterhood Is Forever: The Women's Anthology for a New Millennium, edited by Robin Morgan.

On June 1, 2013, Steinem performed on stage at the "Chime For Change: The Sound Of Change Live" Concert at Twickenham Stadium in London, England. Later in 2014, UN Women began its commemoration of the 20th anniversary of the Fourth World Conference on Women, and as part of that campaign Steinem (and others) spoke at the Apollo Theater in New York City. Chime For Change was funded by Gucci, focusing on using innovative approaches to raise funds and awareness especially regarding girls and women.

Steinem has stated, "I think the fact that I've become a symbol for the women's movement is somewhat accidental. A woman member of Congress, for example, might be identified as a member of Congress; it doesn't mean she's any less of a feminist but she's identified by her nearest male analog. Well, I don't have a male analog so the press has to identify me with the movement. I suppose I could be referred to as a journalist, but because Ms. is part of a movement and not just a typical magazine, I'm more likely to be identified with the movement. There's no other slot to put me in."

Contrary to popular belief, Steinem did not coin the feminist slogan "A woman needs a man like a fish needs a bicycle". Although she helped popularize it, the phrase is actually attributable to Irina Dunn. When Time magazine published an article attributing the saying to Steinem, Steinem wrote a letter saying the phrase had been coined by Dunn.

Another phrase sometimes wrongly attributed to Steinem is: "If men could get pregnant, abortion would be a sacrament." Steinem herself attributed it to "an old Irish woman taxi driver in Boston", whom she said she and Florynce Kennedy met.

Steinem joins Women Cross DMZ 
On May 24, 2015, International Women's Day for Disarmament, thirty women— including two Nobel Peace laureates and retired Colonel Ann Wright— from 15 countries linked arms with 10,000 Korean women, stationing themselves on both sides of the DMZ to urge a formal end to the Korean War (1950-1953), the reunification of families divided during the war, and a peace building process with women in leadership positions to resolve seventy years of hostility following WWII. It was unusual for South Korea and North Korea to reach consensus on allowing peace activists to enter the tense border area, one of the world's most dangerous places, where hundreds of thousands of troops are stationed in a heavily mined zone that divides South Korea from nuclear North Korea.

In addition to Steinem, participants in crossing the DMZ included organizer Christine Ahn from Hawaii; feminist Suzuyo Takazato from Okinawa; Amnesty International human rights lawyer Erika Guevara of Mexico; Liberian peace and reconciliation advocate Leymah Gbowee; Philippines lawmaker Liza Maza; Northern Ireland peace activist Mairead Maguire and Colonel Ann Wright, a retired officer who resigned from the U.S. military to protest the US invasion of Iraq.

Steinem was the honorary co-chairwoman of 2015 Women's Walk For Peace In Korea with Mairead Maguire, and in the weeks leading up to the walk Steinem told the press, "It's hard to imagine any more physical symbol of the insanity of dividing human beings." The group's main goal is to advocate disarmament and seek Korea's reunification. It will be holding international peace symposiums both in Pyongyang and Seoul in which women from both North Korea and South Korea can share experiences and ideas of mobilizing women to stop the Korean crisis. It is especially believed that the role of women in this act would help and support the reunification of family members divided by the split prolonged for 70 years.

She is also the chair of the advisory board of Apne Aap Women Worldwide, an organization fighting sex trafficking and inter-generational prostitution in India, founded by Ruchira Gupta. She has also written extensively on her travels, experiences with women and the Indian feminist movement with her colleague and friend, Ruchira Gupta.
In 2014, Steinem and Gupta traveled through India to meet the country's young feminists, writers, and thought leaders. A diary was kept documenting their travels, "Notes on A Tour of the Indian Women's Movement".

Involvement in political campaigns 
Steinem's involvement in presidential campaigns stretches back to her support of Adlai Stevenson in the 1952 presidential campaign.

1968 election 
A proponent of civil rights and fierce critic of the Vietnam War, Steinem was initially drawn to Senator Eugene McCarthy because of his "admirable record" on those issues, but after meeting him and hearing him speak, she found him "cautious, uninspired, and dry". As the campaign progressed, Steinem became baffled at "personally vicious" attacks that McCarthy leveled against his primary opponent Robert F. Kennedy, even as "his real opponent, Hubert Humphrey, went free".

On a late-night radio show, Steinem garnered attention for declaring "George McGovern is the real Eugene McCarthy". In 1968, Steinem was chosen to pitch the arguments to McGovern as to why he should enter the presidential race that year; he agreed, and Steinem "consecutively or simultaneously served as pamphlet writer, advance 'man', fund raiser, lobbyist of delegates, errand runner, and press secretary".

McGovern lost the nomination at the 1968 Democratic National Convention, and Steinem later wrote of her astonishment at Hubert Humphrey's "refusal even to suggest to Chicago Mayor Richard J. Daley that he control the rampaging police and the bloodshed in the streets".

1972 election 

Steinem was reluctant to re-join the McGovern campaign, as although she had brought in McGovern's single largest campaign contributor in 1968, she "still had been treated like a frivolous pariah by much of McGovern's campaign staff". In April 1972, Steinem remarked that he "still doesn't understand the Women's Movement".

McGovern ultimately excised the abortion issue from the party's platform, and recent publications show McGovern was deeply conflicted on the issue. Steinem later wrote this description of the events:

However, Germaine Greer flatly contradicted Steinem's account, reporting, "Jacqui Ceballos called from the crowd to demand abortion rights on the Democratic platform, but Bella [Abzug] and Gloria stared glassily out into the room, thus killing the abortion rights platform", and asking "Why had Bella and Gloria not helped Jacqui to nail him on abortion? What reticence, what loserism had afflicted them?" Steinem later recalled that the 1972 Convention was the only time Greer and Steinem ever met.

The cover of Harpers that month read, "Womanlike, they did not want to get tough with their man, and so, womanlike, they got screwed".

2004 election 
In the run-up to the 2004 election, Steinem voiced fierce criticism of the Bush administration, asserting, "There has never been an administration that has been more hostile to women's equality, to reproductive freedom as a fundamental human right, and has acted on that hostility", adding, "If he is elected in 2004, abortion will be criminalized in this country". At a Planned Parenthood event in Boston, Steinem declared Bush "a danger to health and safety", citing his antagonism to the Clean Water Act, reproductive freedom, sex education, and AIDS relief.

2008 election 
Steinem was an active participant in the 2008 presidential campaign, and praised both the Democratic front-runners, commenting,

Nevertheless, Steinem endorsed Senator Hillary Clinton, citing her broader experience, and saying that the nation was in such bad shape it might require two terms of Clinton and two of Obama to fix it.

She also made headlines for a New York Times op-ed in which she cited gender and not race as "probably the most restricting force in American life".  She elaborated, "Black men were given the vote a half-century before women of any race were allowed to mark a ballot, and generally have ascended to positions of power, from the military to the boardroom, before any women."

Steinem again drew attention for, according to the New York Observer, seeming "to denigrate the importance of John McCain's time as a prisoner of war in Vietnam"; Steinem's broader argument "was that the media and the political world are too admiring of militarism in all its guises".

Following McCain's selection of Sarah Palin as his running mate, Steinem penned an op-ed in which she labeled Palin an "unqualified woman" who "opposes everything most other women want and need", described her nomination speech as "divisive and deceptive", called for a more inclusive Republican Party, and concluded that Palin resembled "Phyllis Schlafly, only younger".

2016 election 

In an HBO interview with Bill Maher, Steinem, when asked to explain the broad support for Bernie Sanders among young Democratic women, responded, "When you're young, you're thinking, 'Where are the boys? The boys are with Bernie.'" Her comments triggered widespread criticism, and Steinem later issued an apology and said her comments had been "misinterpreted".

Steinem endorsed Democratic candidate Hillary Clinton in the run-up for the 2016 U.S. presidential election. Steinem was an honorary co-chair of and speaker at the Women's March on Washington on January 21, 2017, the day after the inauguration of Donald Trump as president.

CIA ties and leader of Independent Research Service 
In 1967, Steinem revealed in an interview with The New York Times that she worked full time from 1958 until 1962 at the Independent Research Service, which was largely financed by the CIA. In May 1975, Redstockings, a radical feminist group, published a report that Steinem and others put together on the Vienna Youth Festival and its attendees for the Independent Research Service. Redstockings raised the question of whether Steinem had continuing ties with the CIA, which Steinem denied. Steinem defended her relationship to the CIA, saying: "In my experience The Agency was completely different from its image; it was liberal, nonviolent and honorable."

Personal life 
In the late 1980s and early 1990s, Steinem had a four-year relationship with the publisher Mortimer Zuckerman.

On September 3, 2000, at age 66, Steinem married David Bale, father of actor Christian Bale. The wedding was performed at the home of her friend Wilma Mankiller, the first female Principal Chief of the Cherokee Nation. Steinem technically became stepmother to Bale's four adult children; she has no biological children. Steinem and Bale were married for only three years before he died of brain lymphoma on December 30, 2003, at age 62.

Steinem was diagnosed with breast cancer in 1986 and trigeminal neuralgia in 1994.

Commenting on aging, Steinem says that as she approached 60 she felt like she entered a new phase in life that was free of the "demands of gender" that she faced from adolescence onward.

Steinem lives alone in New York's Upper East Side, where she owns the first three floors of her historic brownstone apartment. In 2021, on her 87th birthday, Google Arts & Culture launched  a virtual tour of her home, where she has lived since 1966.

When taking part in season 5 of Finding Your Roots with Henry Louis Gates, Jr., comedian Tig Notaro discovered she and Steinem are distant cousins.

Political positions 

Although most frequently considered a liberal feminist, Steinem has repeatedly characterized herself as a radical feminist. More importantly, she has repudiated categorization within feminism as "nonconstructive to specific problems", saying: "I've turned up in every category. So it makes it harder for me to take the divisions with great seriousness." Nevertheless, on concrete issues, Steinem has staked several firm positions.

Female genital mutilation 
In 1979, Steinem wrote the article on female genital mutilation that brought it into the American public's consciousness; the article "The International Crime of Female Genital Mutilation" was published in the March 1979 issue of Ms. The article reported on the "75 million women suffering with the results of genital mutilation". According to Steinem, "The real reasons for genital mutilation can only be understood in the context of the "patriarchy": men must control women's bodies as the means of production, and thus repress the independent power of women's sexuality." 

Steinem's article contains the basic arguments that would later be developed by philosopher Martha Nussbaum.

Feminist theory 

Steinem has frequently voiced her disapproval of the obscurantism and abstractions some claim to be prevalent in feminist academic theorizing. She said, "Nobody cares about feminist academic writing. That's careerism. These poor women in academia have to talk this silly language that nobody can understand in order to be accepted[...] But I recognize the fact that we have this ridiculous system of tenure, that the whole thrust of academia is one that values education, in my opinion, in inverse ratio to its usefulness—and what you write in inverse relationship to its understandability." Steinem later singled out deconstructionists like Judith Butler for criticism, saying, "I always wanted to put a sign up on the road to Yale saying, 'Beware: Deconstruction Ahead'. Academics are forced to write in language no one can understand so that they get tenure. They have to say 'discourse', not 'talk'. Knowledge that is not accessible is not helpful. It becomes aerialised—and I think it's important that women's experiences be given a narrative."

Kinsey Reports 
In addition to feminism, Steinem has also been a prominent advocate for analyzing the Kinsey Reports.

Pornography 
Steinem has criticized pornography, which she distinguishes from erotica, writing: "Erotica is as different from pornography as love is from rape, as dignity is from humiliation, as partnership is from slavery, as pleasure is from pain." Steinem's argument hinges on the distinction between reciprocity versus domination, as she writes, "Blatant or subtle, pornography involves no equal power or mutuality. In fact, much of the tension and drama comes from the clear idea that one person is dominating the other."

On the issue of same-sex pornography, Steinem asserts, "Whatever the gender of the participants, all pornography including male-male gay pornography is an imitation of the male-female, conqueror-victim paradigm, and almost all of it actually portrays or implies enslaved women and master." Steinem has also cited "snuff films" as a serious threat to women.

Same-sex marriage 
In an essay published in Time magazine on August 31, 1970, "What Would It Be Like If Women Win", Steinem wrote about same-sex marriage in the context of the "Utopian" future she envisioned, writing:

Although Steinem did not mention or advocate same-sex marriage in any published works or interviews for more than three decades, she again expressed support for same-sex marriage in the early 2000s, stating in 2004 that "[the] idea that sexuality is only okay if it ends in reproduction oppresses women—whose health depends on separating sexuality from reproduction—as well as gay men and lesbians." Steinem is also a signatory of the 2008 manifesto, "Beyond Same-Sex Marriage: A New Strategic Vision For All Our Families and Relationships", which advocates extending legal rights and privileges to a wide range of relationships, households, and families.

Transgender rights 
In 1977, Steinem expressed disapproval that the heavily publicized sex reassignment surgery of tennis player Renée Richards had been in her opinion characterized as either a frightening look at what feminism could cause or as proof that feminism was no longer necessary. Steinem wrote that the issue was at minimum "a diversion from the widespread problems of sexual inequality." She also wrote that, while she supported the right of individuals to identify as they choose, she believed some transsexuals "surgically mutilate their own bodies" in order to conform to a gender role that is inexorably tied to physical body parts. She claimed that "feminists are right to feel uncomfortable about the need for and uses of transsexualism."

On October 2, 2013, Steinem clarified her remarks on transgender people in an op-ed for The Advocate, writing that critics failed to consider that her 1977 essay was "written in the context of global protests against routine surgical assaults, called female genital mutilation by some survivors." Steinem later in the piece expressed unequivocal support for transgender people, saying that transgender people "including those who have transitioned, are living out real, authentic lives. Those lives should be celebrated, not questioned." She also apologized for any pain her words might have caused.

On June 15, 2020, Steinem co-wrote a letter with Mona Sinha to the editor of The New York Times, in which they opposed the elimination of civil rights protections for transgender healthcare by the Trump administration. In it, they made note of precolonial American traditions of gender variance and claimed that "the health of any of us affects the health of all of us, and excluding trans people endangers us all."

Awards and honors 
 American Civil Liberties Union of Southern California's Bill of Rights Award
 American Humanist Association's 2012 Humanist of the Year (2012)
 Biography magazine's 25 most influential women in America (Steinem was listed as one of them)
 Clarion award
 DVF Lifetime Leadership Award (2014)
 Emmy Citation for excellence in television writing
 Esquire'''s 75 greatest women of all time (Steinem was listed as one of them) (2010)
 Equality Now's international human rights award, given jointly to her and Efua Dorkenoo (2000)
 FAO CERES Medal
 Front Page award
 Glamour magazine's "The 75 Most Important Women of the Past 75 Years" (Steinem was listed as one of them) (2014)
 Lambda Legal Defense and Education Fund's Liberty Award
 Library Lion award (2015)
 The Ms. Foundation for Women's Gloria Awards, given annually since 1988, are named after Steinem.
 National Gay Rights Advocates Award
 National Magazine awards
 National Women's Hall of Fame inductee (1993)
 New York Women's Foundation's Century Award (2014)
 Parenting's Lifetime Achievement Award (1995)
 Penney-Missouri Journalism Award
 Presidential Medal of Freedom (2013)
 Rutgers University announced the Gloria Steinem Endowed Chair in September 2014. The Chair was created to fund teaching and research for someone (not necessarily a woman) who exemplifies Steinem's values of equal representation in the media, and to have this person teach at least one undergraduate course per semester.
 Sara Curry Humanitarian Award (2007)
 Simmons College's Doctorate of Human Justice
 Society of Professional Journalists' Lifetime Achievement in Journalism Award
 Supersisters trading card set (card number 32 featured Steinem's name and picture) (1979)
 United Nations' Ceres Medal
 United Nations' Society of Writers Award
 University of Missouri School of Journalism Award for Distinguished Service in Journalism
 Women's Sports Journalism Award
 2015 Richard C. Holbrooke Distinguished Achievement Award of the Dayton Literary Peace Prize
 Recipient of the 2017 Ban Ki-moon Award For Women's Empowerment
 On May 20, 2019, Steinem received an honorary degree from Yale University.
 On May 19, 2021, Steinem received the Princess of Asturias Award for Communication and Humanities.

 In media 

In 1995, Education of a Woman: The Life of Gloria Steinem, by Carolyn Heilbrun, was published.

In 1997, Gloria Steinem: Her Passions, Politics, and Mystique, by Sydney Ladensohn Stern, was published.

In 2005, Steinem appeared in season 2, episode 13 of The L Word

In the musical Legally Blonde, which premiered in 2007, Steinem is mentioned in the scene where Elle Woods wears a flashy Bunny costume to a party, and must pretend to be dressed as Gloria Steinem "researching her feminist manifesto 'I Was A Playboy Bunny. (The actual name of the piece by Steinem being referred to here is "A Bunny's Tale".)

In 2011, Gloria: In Her Own Words, a documentary, first aired.

In 2013, Female Force: Gloria Steinem, a comic book by Melissa Seymour, was published.

Also in 2013, Steinem was featured in the documentary MAKERS: Women Who Make America about the feminist movement.

In 2014, Who Is Gloria Steinem?, by Sarah Fabiny, was published.

Also in 2014, Steinem appeared in season 1, episode 8, of the television show The Sixties.Also in 2014, Steinem appeared in season 6, episode 3, of the television show The Good Wife.In 2016, Steinem was featured in the catalog of clothing retailer Lands' End. After an outcry from anti-abortion customers, the company removed Steinem from their website, stating on their Facebook page: "It was never our intention to raise a divisive political or religious issue, so when some of our customers saw the recent promotion that way, we heard them. We sincerely apologize for any offense."  The company then faced further criticism online, this time both from customers who were still unhappy that Steinem had been featured in the first place, and customers who were unhappy that Steinem had been removed.

In Jennifer Lopez's 2016 music video for her song "Ain't Your Mama", Steinem can be heard saying part of her "Address to the Women of America" speech, specifically, "This is no simple reform. It really is a revolution."

Also in 2016, the television series Woman premiered, featuring Steinem as producer and host; it is a documentary series concerning sexist injustice and violence worldwide.

The Gloria Steinem Papers are held in the Sophia Smith Collection at Smith College, under collection number MS 237.

The play Gloria: A Life, about Steinem's life, opened October 2018 at the Daryl Roth Theatre, directed by Diane Paulus.The Glorias is an American biographical film about Steinem which premiered in 2020. In the film, she is played by four actresses who portray her life at various ages: Ryan Kiera Armstrong as a child, Lulu Wilson as a teen, Alicia Vikander between the ages of 20 and 40, and Julianne Moore as an older woman.

In 2020, Steinem was portrayed by Rose Byrne in the FX miniseries Mrs. America, depicting the movement to ratify the Equal Rights Amendment (ERA).

 Works 
 The Thousand Indias (1957)
 The Beach Book (1963), New York: Viking Press. 
 Outrageous Acts and Everyday Rebellions (1983), New York: Holt, Rinehart, and Winston. 
 Marilyn: Norma Jean (1986), with George Barris, New York: Holt. 
 Revolution from Within (1992), Boston: Little, Brown. 
 Moving beyond Words (1993), New York: Simon & Schuster. 
 Doing Sixty & Seventy (2006), San Francisco: Elders Academy Press. 
 As if Women Matter: The Essential Gloria Steinem Reader (2014), co-written with Ruchira Gupta. 
 My Life on the Road (2015), New York: Random House. 
 The Truth Will Set You Free, But First It Will Piss You Off! (2015), illustrated by Samantha Dion Baker. New York: Random House. 
 My Life on the Road (2016), New York: Random House. 

 See also 
 Feminism in the United States
 List of women's rights activists

 References 

 Further reading 

 Education of A Woman: The Life of Gloria Steinem by Carolyn Heilbrun (Ballantine Books, United States, 1995) 
 Gloria Steinem: Her Passions, Politics, and Mystique by Sydney Ladensohn Stern (Birch Lane Press, 1997) 

 External links 

 
 Gloria Steinem papers in the Sophia Smith Collection, Smith College Special Collections 
 Profile at Feminist.com
 Gloria Steinem  Video produced by Makers: Women Who Make America (affiliated with Women Make Movies)
 Gloria Steinem Papers at the Sophia Smith Collection
 
 Michals, Debra "Gloria Steinem". National Women's History Museum. 2017.
 Interview with Gloria Steinem, A DISCUSSION WITH National Authors on Tour'' TV Series, Episode #97 (1994)

1934 births
20th-century American women writers
21st-century American journalists
21st-century American women writers
Activists against female genital mutilation
Activists from Ohio
American abortion-rights activists
American expatriates in India
American feminist writers
American humanists
American opinion journalists
American people of German descent
American people of German-Jewish descent
American people of Polish-Jewish descent
American people of Scottish descent
American political activists
American political writers
American socialist feminists
American tax resisters
American women journalists
American women's rights activists
Anti-pornography activists
Anti-pornography feminists
Childfree
Critics of postmodernism
Feminist theorists
Jewish American journalists
Jewish American writers
Jewish feminists
Jewish humanists
Jewish socialists
Journalists from Ohio
American LGBT rights activists
Living people
Members of the Democratic Socialists of America
People from Toledo, Ohio
Presidential Medal of Freedom recipients
Radical feminists
Smith College alumni
Writers from Toledo, Ohio
Equal Rights Amendment activists